Haft Rangu (also Romanized as Haft Rangū; also known as Haft Rang) is a village in Salakh Rural District, Shahab District, Qeshm County, Hormozgan Province, Iran. At the 2006 census, its population was 513, in 100 families.

References 

Populated places in Qeshm County